The European Association of Co-operative Banks (EACB)  (GEBC in French) is the leading trade association for the co-operative banking sector with 27 member institutions and co-operative banks located in 22 countries worldwide. As the representative of the world's largest cooperative banking cluster, the EACB promotes the interests co-operative banks, or banks that provide access to finance at the local level with a relatively small investment.

As an international non-profit Association based in Brussels, the EACB is recognized as a key interlocutor for cooperative banks by the regulators and supervisors at EU and international levels. The EACB works together with more than 200 experts from its member organizations. The association represents, promotes and defends the values of the co-operative banking model in Europe and on the global stage.

The EACB offers a comprehensive set of policy resources for co-operative banks worldwide. These resources as well as data on the co-operative banking sector are available on the EACB website.

Co-operative banks at a glance 

Co-operative banks serve 214 million customers.

Co-operative banks are mutual and private banks, owned by their 85 million members.

Co-operative banks share common values and foster local growth and entrepreneurship through their 2.700 regional and local banks, 43.000 branches.

Co-operative banks employ 713,000 individuals nationally.

Co-operative banks manage more than €7,9 trillion in banking assets.

Co-operative banks safeguard €4,2 trillion in deposits

Co-operative banks extend more than €4,6 trillion in loans.

Creation 

Following an initiative launched by Mr. Johannes TEICHERT, a first meeting with representatives of the European Commission was held in December 1969 with the aim to create a representative body for credit co-operatives of the 6 EU-member states. Hence the Association of Co-operative Savings and Credit Institutions of the E.E.C. was officially created on October 1, 1970. The first statutes of the Association were signed at the end of 1971 by the following founding members:

 Caisse Centrale des Associations Agricole Luxembourgeoises
 Centrale Raiffeisenkas, Leuven Belgium
 Confédération Nationale du Crédit Mutuel, Paris
 Coöperatieve Centrale Boerenleenbank, Eindhoven
 Coöperatieve Centrale Raiffeisen-Bank, Utrecht
 Deutsche Genossenschaftskasse, Frankfurt
 Deutscher Raiffeisenverband, Bonn
 Ente Nazionale Delle Casse Rurale Agrari ed Ente Ausiliari, Rome
 Fédération Centrale du Crédit Agricole Mutuel, Paris
 Fédération Nationale du Crédit Agricole, Paris
 Federazione Italiana dei Consorzi Agrari, Rome
 Union du Crédit Coopératif, Paris

Structure 

The EACB is a European non-profit association, located and registered in Belgium. It is headed by a President and regulated by the Board and the Executive Committee. The General Manager, Mr. Hervé Guider leads the Secretariat based in Brussels.

The EACB supports the code of conduct on lobbying of the European Commission and is registered in the EU transparency register book (Transparency Book Register 4172526951-19).

The President is elected for 2 years with a mandate, which may be renewed once. He chairs the Board and the Executive Committee. The Board meets 3 to 4 times a year and defines the general policy. The Executive Committee is composed of 39 appointed Members, who endorse recommendations put forward by the Working Groups members. They meet three times a year. The activities of the EACB are articulated around Working Groups and Taskforces, covering topics from banking legislation to customer policy, CSR and Social Affairs.

Overview of the presidents of the EACB 
1970 – 1977   : President Van Campen, Centrale Coöperatieve Boerenleenbank

1977 – 1981   : President Braun, Crédit Mutuel

1982 – 1986   : President Lardinois, Rabobank Nederland

1986 – 1989   : President Schramm, BVR, Germany

1989 – 1995   : President Barsalou, Crédit Agricole, Paris

1995 – 1999   : President Grüger, BVR Germany

1999 – 2002   : President Meijer, Rabobank Nederland

2002 – 2006   : President Pflimlin, Crédit Mutuel Paris

2006 – 2008   : President Pleister, BVR, Germany

2008 – 2012   : President Moerland, Rabobank Nederland

2012 - 2016    : President Talgorn, Crédit Agricole S.A.

2016 - 2020 : President Hofmann, BVR Germany

Since 2020 : President Marttin, Rabobank Nederland

Overview of the secretaries general 
1970 - 1982      : Johannes Teichert

1982 – 1996     : Guido Ravoet

1996 – 2001     : Johann-G. von Süsskind

2001 - 2021     : Hervé Guider 

Since 2021      : Nina Schindler

Members of the EACB

Full members

Associate members

Relationship with other European banking industry and co-operatives representatives 

As the voice of co-operative banks, the EACB maintains close relations with other bodies that regroup certain co-operative banks with the purpose of enhancing business co-operation, such as the Conféderation Internationale des Banques Populaires (CIBP). In addition, the EACB is a member of Co-operatives Europe, a collection of 83 member organizations from 33 European countries. The EACB is a founding member of the European Payments Council (EPC), the European Banking Industry Committee (EBIC), and the European Financial Reporting Advisory Group (EFRAG).

See also 
European Central Bank
European Securities and Market Authorities
European Banking Authority
International Monetary Fund
World Bank Group
EBIC (European Banking Industry Committee)
EFRAG (European Financial Reporting Advisory Group)
EPC (European Payments Council)

References

Bankers associations
Cooperative banking in Europe
European trade associations
1970 establishments in Europe
Organizations established in 1970
Banking organizations